The United States Central Intelligence Agency (CIA) dates from September 18, 1947, when President Harry S. Truman signed the National Security Act of 1947 into law.  A major impetus that has been cited over the years for the creation of the CIA was the unforeseen attack on Pearl Harbor,
but whatever Pearl Harbor's role, at the close of World War II government circles identified a need for a group to coordinate government intelligence efforts, and the Federal Bureau of Investigation (FBI), the  State Department, the  War Department, and even the Post Office were all jockeying for that new power.

General William "Wild Bill" Donovan, head of the Office of Strategic Services (OSS), wrote to President Franklin D. Roosevelt on November 18, 1944, stating the need for a peacetime "Central Intelligence Service ... which will procure intelligence both by overt and covert methods and will at the same time provide intelligence guidance, determine national intelligence objectives, and correlate the intelligence material collected by all government agencies", and have authority to conduct "subversive operations abroad", but "no police or law enforcement functions, either at home or abroad". Donovan's letter was prompted by a query from General Dwight Eisenhower's Chief of Staff about the nature of the role of the OSS in the military establishment.  Following this, Roosevelt ordered his chief military aide to conduct a secret investigation of the OSS's World War II operations.  Around this time, stories about the OSS began circulating in major papers, including references to this OSS follow-on being an "American Gestapo". The report, heavily influenced by an FBI that saw itself as the future of American foreign intelligence, was starkly and vividly negative, only praising a few rescues of downed airmen, sabotage operations, and its deskbound research- and analysis-staff; the pronouncement of the report was that any "use [of the OSS] as a secret intelligence agency in the postwar world [would be] inconceivable", but even before the report was finished the President - presumably under pressure from the press articles - had ordered the Joint Chiefs to shelve their plans for a Central Intelligence Service even before the April release of the report.

On September 20, 1945, as part of Truman's dismantling of the World War II war machine, the OSS, at one time numbering almost 13,000 staff, was eliminated over the span of ten days.  A reprieve, though, was granted six days later by the Assistant Secretary of War, reducing it to a skeleton crew of roughly 15% of its peak force level, forcing it to close many of its foreign offices; at the same time the name of the service was changed from the OSS to the Strategic Services Unit.

Immediate predecessors, 1946–47

During World War II, President Roosevelt was concerned about American covert intelligence capabilities, particularly in the light of the success of Churchill's Commandos. On the suggestion of a senior British intelligence officer, he asked Colonel William "Wild Bill" Donovan to devise a combined intelligence service modeled on the British Secret Intelligence Service (MI6), and Special Operations Executive, centralizing, for instance, the separate cryptanalysis programs of the Army, and Navy.  This resulted in the creation of the Office of Strategic Services. On September 20, 1945, shortly after the end of World War II, President Harry S. Truman signed Executive Order 9621, dissolving the OSS by October 1, 1945. The rapid reorganizations that followed reflected not only routine bureaucratic competition for resources but also exploration of the proper relationships between clandestine intelligence collection and covert action (i.e., paramilitary and psychological operations). In October 1945, the functions of the OSS were split between the Departments of State and War:

The three-way division lasted only a few months. The first public mention of the "Central Intelligence Agency" concept and term appeared on a U.S. Army and Navy command-restructuring proposal presented by James Forrestal and Arthur Radford to the U.S. Senate Military Affairs Committee at the end of 1945. Despite opposition from the military establishment, the United States Department of State and the Federal Bureau of Investigation (FBI), President Truman established the National Intelligence Authority on January 22, 1946, by presidential directive; it was the direct predecessor to the CIA. The National Intelligence Authority and its operational extension, the Central Intelligence Group (CIG), was disestablished after twenty months. The assets of the SSU, which now constituted a streamlined "nucleus" of clandestine intelligence, were transferred to the CIG in mid-1946 and reconstituted as the Office of Special Operations (OSO).

Legislative foundation

Lawrence Houston, the first General Counsel of the CIG, and, later, the CIA, had many concerns about the lack of a congressional mandate.  With the support of Director Hoyt Vandenberg he became a principle draftsman of the National Security Act of 1947 which, on September 18, established both the National Security Council and the Central Intelligence Agency. In 1949, Lawrence Houston, along with his two assistant general counsels, helped draft the Central Intelligence Agency Act, (Public law 81-110) which authorized the agency to use confidential fiscal and administrative procedures, and exempted it from most of the usual limitations on the use of Federal funds. It also exempted the CIA from having to disclose its "organization, functions, names, official titles, salaries, or numbers of personnel employed." It also created the program "PL-110", to handle defectors and other "essential aliens" who fall outside normal immigration procedures, as well as giving those persons cover stories and economic support.

New director

In July 1946 Vandenberg reorganized the Central Reports staff into the larger Office of Reports and Estimates.  The ORE drew its reports from a daily take of State Department telegrams, military dispatches, and internal CIG reports that went to specialized analysts.  The ORE's main products quickly became popular, they were the "Daily Summary", and the "Weekly Summary".  The ORE also produced "Intelligence Highlights" for internal consumption, and "Intelligence Memorandums" for the DCI, who could distribute them at his discretion.  These reports dominated the work of the ORE at the expense of its work on Estimates.

Vandenberg quickly moved to the position as Commander of the newly formed Air Force that he had been waiting for.  He was replaced by Roscoe Hillenkoetter.  Under Hillenkoetter the ORE split into Global Survey, Current Intelligence, and Estimates.  The sharp focus on the grind of Current Intelligence, with its popular, widely distributed products continued to dominate the ORE leaving little room for the other sections to grow, but it did lead to slow improvements, and the ORE increased the number of products it offered, adding "Situation Reports" that would be used as handbooks for individual countries, and the monthly "Review of the World Situation".  Like other organs of the CIA, the ORE received a regular stream of requests from the rest of the Government, including the NSC, Joint Chiefs of Staff (JCS), Department of State, and branches of the military.  Problems with the early ORE recognized within the CIA itself were that, of its eleven regular publications, only one of them addressed strategic, or national intelligence questions, and that most of the sources of information relied on to produce ORE products were "open source", the CIA itself had little capability to produce intelligence on which to base its own reports and estimates.  "The CIA had only a few officers in Korea before the June 1950 invasion, and none reported to Agency analytical branches."   Shortly after the invasion of South Korea Truman, on 21 August 1950, announced Walter Bedell Smith as the new Director of the CIA to correct what was seen as a grave failure of Intelligence.

Intelligence vs. action

In the beginning, Central Intelligence was the beast of three masters: Truman, who, from his position under a mountain of state, DOD, and FBI reports (the FBI having jurisdiction in Latin America) quickly saw the need for a centralized outlet to organize the information that would reach his desk; Defense, who wanted CI to both know everything about military adversaries, perform military sabotage, and foment partisans that would fight with the US if war came; and the State Department, that wanted CI to bring global political change positive to the ends of the US.  Organizationally, this gave CI two areas of responsibility; Covert Action, and Covert Intelligence.

Office of Special Operations (Covert Intelligence)

Sidney Souers (formerly Deputy Chief of Naval Intelligence), after a little more than a hundred days in his position as the first Director of the Central Intelligence Group during which "The Pentagon and the State Department refused to talk to [the CIG]", and "the FBI treated [the CIG] with the deepest disdain", left a top secret note simply stating "There is an urgent need to develop the highest possible quality of information on the USSR in the shortest possible time" before he completed the goal he set out in his first days of office...  "[going] home".

General Hoyt Vandenberg, Eisenhower's commander of air operations in Europe, and, later, his Intelligence Chief became the CIG's second director while waiting to be appointed the first Commander of the United States Air Force.  One of his first actions was creating the Office of Special Operations, and the Office of Reports and Estimates.  In the beginning the OSO was tasked with spying and subversion overseas with a budget of $15 million, the largess of a small number of patrons in congress.  Vandenberg's goals were much like the ones set out by his predecessor in the note he left leaving office, finding out "everything about the Soviet forces in Eastern and Central Europe – their movements, their capabilities, and their intentions" in the shortest possible time.  This task fell to the 228 overseas personnel covering Germany, Austria, Switzerland, Poland, Czechoslovakia, and Hungary.  These men were plagued by a problem that always plagued the CIA, distinguishing the accurate from the inaccurate.  Richard Helms, the man in charge, would later find that at least half of the information that made it into CIA files was inaccurate.  In its early years, the CIA was caught flatfooted by several world events critical to the nation, blinded by, among other things, its inability to separate truth from fiction.

Office of Policy Coordination (Covert Action)

The history of CI covert action had an ignominious start when, before the creation of the Office of Policy Coordination, The New York Times reported on CI's first covert action, noting the arrest of a CI agent in connection with his meeting with the Romanian National Peasants' Party, along with the arrest of the party's leaders on the charge of treason.

On June 18, 1948, the National Security Council issued Directive 10/2 "[calling] for covert operations to attack the Soviets around the world," and giving the CIA the authority to carry out covert operations "against hostile foreign states or groups or in support of friendly foreign states or groups but which are so planned and conducted that any U.S. government responsibility for them is not evident to unauthorized persons and that if uncovered the US Government can plausibly disclaim any responsibility for them."  To this end, the Office of Policy Coordination was created inside the new CIA.  It is important to note, though, that the OPC was quite unique.  Frank Wisner, the head of the OPC answered not to the DI, but to the secretaries of defense, state, and the NSC, and the OPC's actions were a secret even from the head of the CIA.  Most CIA stations had two station chiefs, one working for the OSO, and one working for the OPC.  Their relationship was competitive, even poaching each other's agents, a lopsided competition, the better funded OPC often claiming victory.

Early successes and failures

In the early days of the cold war, successes for the CIA were few and far between.  The gradual Soviet takeover of Romania, the Soviet takeover of Czechoslovakia, the Soviet blockade of Berlin, CIA assessments of the Soviet atomic bomb project, the Korean War, and then, when the 300,000 Chinese troops waiting at the Korean border entered the war, all, arguably, failures of Central intelligence of the highest profile imaginable.  The famous double agent Kim Philby was the British liaison to American Central Intelligence.  Through him the CIA coordinated hundreds of airdrop operations inside the iron curtain, all compromised by Philby.  American intelligence suffered from almost countless compromises of the networks it tried to set up.  There were spies in the Manhattan project, and even Arlington Hall, the nerve center of CIA cryptanalysis was compromised by William Weisband, a Russian translator and Soviet spy.  The CIA reused the tactic of dropping plant agents behind enemy lines by parachute again on China, and North Korea.  This too was fruitless.

Cryptanalysis was not the CIA's sole success story.  In the 1948 Italian election the CIA quietly backed the Christian Democrats.  James Forrestal and Allen Dulles passed a hat around Wall Street and Washington, D.C., then Forrestal went to the Secretary of the Treasury, John W. Snyder, a Truman stalwart.  He allowed them to tap the $200 million Exchange Stabilization Fund which had been designed during the Depression to shore up the value of the dollar overseas, but was used during World War II as a depository for captured Axis Loot, and was, at that time, earmarked for the reconstruction of Europe.  Funds moved from the fund into the bank accounts of wealthy Americans, many of whom had Italian heritage.  Hard cash was then distributed to Catholic Action, the Vatican's political arm, and directly to Italian politicians.  "A long romance between the party and the agency began.  The CIA's practice of purchasing elections and politicians with bags of cash was repeated in Italy – and in many other nations – for the next twenty-five years."

Korean War

During the Korean War, on Yong-Do island in Busan, Hans Tofte had turned over a thousand North Korean expatriates into what the National Security Council hoped would become a fifth column.  They were divided into three tasking groups.  Intelligence gathering through infiltration, guerrilla warfare, and pilot rescue.  Tofte would be filing reports indicating success in operations long after any hope for the infiltration teams was cold in the ground.

In 1952, CIA covert action sent 1,500 more expatriate agents north.  Seoul station chief, and Army Colonel Albert Haney openly celebrated the capabilities of those agents, and the information they sent.  Some Seoul State Department intelligence officers were skeptical, but the party lasted until Haney was replaced, in September 1952, by John Limond Hart, a Europe veteran with a vivid memory for bitter experiences of misinformation.  Hart was immediately suspicious of the parade of successes reported by Tofte and Haney.

After a three month investigation, Hart determined that the entirety of the station's product from Korean sources was either an opportunist's lie, or the misinformation from the enemy, including reports hailed, by American military commanders, as "one of the outstanding intelligence reports of the war."  Another part of the problem was the isolation of the Hermit Kingdom, and its relative lack of importance compared to China, and Japan, which led to a deficiency in Korean language skills.  After the war, internal reviews by the CIA corroborated Hart's findings.  The CIA's Seoul station had 200 officers, but not a single speaker of Korean.  The NSC's $152 million a year covert war was one part meat grinder, and one part delivery system for enemy misinformation.

Hart reported to Washington that Seoul station was hopeless, and could not be salvaged.  Loftus Becker, Deputy Director of Intelligence, was sent personally to tell Hart that the CIA, to save face, had to keep the station open.  Becker returned to Washington, pronounced the situation to be "hopeless", and that, after touring the CIA's Far East operations, the CIA's ability to gather intelligence in the far east was "almost negligible".  He then resigned.  While Allen Dulles was extolling the success of the CIA's guerrillas in Korea, AF Colonel James Kellis says Dulles had been informed that those guerrillas were under the control of the enemy.  Frank Wisner put the Korean failures down to a need "to develop the quantity and kind of people we must have if we are to successfully carry out the heavy burdens which have been placed on us."  A compounding factor was that, even at the height of the Korean war, the CIA kept its primary focus on Europe, and the Soviet Union, through the entire war, the Korean War was always seen as a diversion from Europe.

China

With the Chinese push, the eyes of the NSC turned north.  With no end to the avalanche of money, the CIA explored every option in China.  From Chiang Kai-shek's promise of a million Kuomintang, to the western Chinese Muslim Horsemen of the Hui clans who had ties to Chinese Nationalists.  The CIA ran operations from White Dog island with the nationalists for months until it was discovered that the nationalist commander's Chief of Staff was a spy for Mao.  $50 million went to Okinawa based Chinese refugees who wove tales of sizable support on the mainland.  In July 1952, the CIA sent a team of expatriates in.  Four months later they radioed for help.  It was an ambush.  Two CIA officers, Jack Downey and Dick Fecteau, fresh out of Ivy League colleges, spent more than 19 years in captivity.

Finally the CIA turned to nationalist General Li Mi in Burma.  When Li Mi's troops crossed the border into China an ambush awaited them too.  The CIA later discovered that Li Mi's Bangkok radioman worked for Mao.  CIA supplies still flowed, but Li Mi's men retreated to Burma, and set up a global heroin empire in Burma's Golden Triangle.

Iran

In 1951, Mohammad Mosaddegh, a member of the National Front rose to power campaigning for khal'-e yad(Law of repossession, ie oil nationalization).  This was against the Gass-Golsha`iyan (supplemental oil agreement), which Prime Minister Razmara supported. The supplemental oil agreement with Anglo-Iranian Oil Company got several concessions from the AIOC, including a 50/50 profit split, as well as other concessions for better Iranian representation within the company.  Razmara is assassinated in March 1951.  Khalil Tahmassebi, a member of a terrorist group that follows the teachings of Ayatollah Khomeini is arrested, the next day over 8,000 members of the National Front, and the Marxist Tudeh party protest his arrest.  The protesters threaten to kill the Shah, any Iranian legislator that opposes oil nationalization, and anyone responsible for the imprisonment of Tahmassebi.  Mosaddeq is elected to replace the slain PM, but conditions his acceptance on the nationalization of oil, which went through unanimously.

Nationalization of the British funded Iranian oil industry, including the largest oil refinery in the world, is disastrous.  A British naval embargo successfully shutters the British oil facilities.  Iran has no skilled workers to operate the British facilities, and no way of exporting the product anyway.  In 1952 Mosaddeq bucked against royal refusal to approve his Minister of War, aiming to take control of the military from the Shah.  Mosaddeq resigned in protest, and the Shah installed Ahmad Qavam as PM.  Again the National Front, and Tudeh took to the streets, again threatening assassinations (four Iran Prime Ministers had been assassinated in the last few years).  Five days later the military feared losing control and pulled their troops back and the Shah gave in to Mosaddeq's demands.  Mosaddeq quickly replaced military leaders loyal to the Shah with those loyal to him, giving him personal control over the military.  Mosaddeq took six months of emergency powers, giving him the power to unilaterally pass legislation.  When that expired, his powers were extended for another year.

A bitter irony was that Ayatollah Kashani, who once decried the unforgivable abuses of the British, and Mozzafar Baghai, Mosaddeq's closest political ally, and a man who personally took part in the physical takeover of the largest oil refinery in the world, now found that which they once saw in Mosaddeq in the British.  Mosaddeq began manipulating the Iranian Parliament, but his supporters left quickly.  To prevent the loss of his control of parliament, Mosaddeq dismissed parliament, and, at the same time, took dictatorial powers.  This power grab triggered the Shah to exercise his constitutional right to dismiss Mosaddeq.  Mosaddeq then started a military coup as the Shah fled the country.  As was typical of CIA operations, CIA interventions were preceded by radio announcements on July 7, 1953 made by the CIA's intended victim by way of operational leaks.  On August 19 a CIA paid mob led by Ayatollahs Khomeini, and Kashani sparked what the deputy chief of mission of the U.S. Tehran Embassy called "an almost spontaneous revolution."...  But Mosaddeq was protected by his new inner military circle, and the CIA had been unable to get any sway within the Iranian military.  Their chosen man, former general Zahedi had no troops to call on.  General McClure, commander of the American military assistance advisory group would get his second star buying the loyalty of the Iranian officers he was training.  An attack on Mosaddeq's house forced him to flee.  He surrendered the next day, and his military coup came to an end.  The end result was a 60/40 oil profit split in favor of Iran (possibly similar to agreements with Saudi Arabia and Venezuela).

Guatemala

The return of the Shah to power, and the impression, cultivated by Allen Dulles that an effective CIA had been able to guide the nation to friendly and stable relations with the west triggered planning for Operation Success, a plan to replace Guatemalan President Jacobo Arbenz with Carlos Armas.   As was typical of CIA operations, the plan was exposed in major newspapers even before they started planning it in detail when the CIA agent liaison to Armas left plans for the coup in his Guatemala City hotel room.  Operation Success was buoyed by two great strokes of luck.  When Guatemalan state radio went down for scheduled antenna replacement, the CIA's "Voice of Liberation" radio broadcast moved to replace it.  Speaker of the House John McCormack called a Czech shipment of weapons bypassing the U.S. arms embargo on Guatemala an "atomic bomb planted in America's backyard."  Contrary to contemporary claims of the CIA, the shipment would reach Guatemala undetected, but the second stroke of luck would be that the shipment was mostly rusted junk from World War 2.

Armas struck on June 18th.  While Armas' offensive was ineffectual, Arbenz was apprehensive about the possibility of future successful attacks, and about being betrayed by his military.  On June 22 Allen Dulles walked into the Oval Office certain that only drastic measures could unseat Arbenz and salvage the situation.  In the meeting they said that a filibuster by the chairman of Democrats for Eisenhower, one of Ike's richest, and most generous contributors was their last ditch hope, with a 20% chance of success.  A withdrawal of $150,000 from Riggs Bank purchased three fully armed P-47 Thunderbolts.  On June 27, after days of the miniature bombing campaign, Arbenz, thinking his forces outmatched, and thinking that his grasp on the military was failing ceded power to Colonel Carlos Diaz.  The CIA orchestrated several transfers of power, ending when the CIA finally placed Castillo Armas in the office of President.

Syria

In 1949 Colonel Adib Shishakli rose to power in Syria in a CIA backed coup.  Four years later he was overthrown by the military, Ba'athists, and communists.  The CIA and MI6 started funding right wing members of the military, but suffered a large setback in the aftermath of the Suez Crisis.  CIA Agent Rocky Stone who had played a minor role in the 1953 Iranian coup d'état was working at the Damascus embassy as a diplomat, but was actually the station chief.  Syrian officers on the CIA dole quickly appeared on television stating that they had received money from the "corrupt and sinister Americans" "in an attempt to overthrow the legitimate government of Syria"  Syrian forces surrounded the embassy and rousted Agent Stone, who confessed and subsequently made history as the first American diplomat expelled from an Arab nation.  This strengthened ties between Syria and Egypt, helping establish the United Arab Republic, and poisoning the well for the US for the foreseeable future.  The inability to deny the complicity of the US government put this operation outside the charter of the CIA.

Indonesia

The charismatic leader of Indonesia was President Sukarno.  His declaration of neutrality in the cold war put the suspicions of the CIA on him.  After Sukarno hosted Bandung Conference, promoting the Non-Aligned Movement.  The Eisenhower White House responded with NSC 5518 authorizing "all feasible covert means" to move Indonesia into the Western sphere.  The CIA started funding the Masyumi Party.  Sukarno confounded the CIA's Jakarta station, which had few speakers of native languages, and Al Ulmer, the new head of the CIA's Far East division, knew little about the country.  Spooked by the communist PKI party moving into the third spot, the CIA's alarmed response was in contrast to that of the Ambassador, who maintained that Sukarno maintained an open door to the West.

The U.S. had no clear policy on Indonesia.  President Dwight Eisenhower sent his special assistant for security operations F.M. Dearborn Jr. to Jakarta.  His report that there was great instability, and that the U.S. lacked strong, stable allies, reinforced the domino theory.  Indonesia suffered from what he described as "subversion by democracy".  The CIA decided to back the Permesta rebel movement in Indonesia, where the Indonesian military was trained by the U.S., had a strong professional relationship with the US Military, had a pro-American officer corps, which had strong support for the government, and a strong belief in civilian control of the military, instilled partly by its close association with the US Military.  Demonstrating an intolerance for dissent, the CIA instigated the transfer of the well respected Ambassador Allison, who had a strong background in Asia, to Czechoslovakia.

On September 25, 1957, Eisenhower ordered the CIA to start a revolution in Indonesia with the goal of regime change.  Three days later, Blitz, a Soviet controlled weekly in India reported that the U.S. was plotting to overthrow Sukarno.  The story was picked up by the media in Indonesia.  One of the first parts of the operation was an 11,500 ton US navy ship landing at Sumatra, delivering weapons for as many as 8,000 potential revolutionaries.  The delivery drew a crowd of spectators, and, again, little thought was given to plausible deniability.  Counter to CIA predictions, the Indonesian military, with some planning assistance from their colleagues in the US Military, the only people the CIA had successfully kept their involvement a secret from, reacted swiftly and effectively.

CIA Agent Al Pope's bombing and strafing Indonesia in a CIA B-26 was described by the CIA to the President as attacks by "dissident planes".  Al Pope's B-26 was shot down over Indonesia on May 18, and he bailed out.  When he was captured, the Indonesian military found his personnel records, after action reports, and his membership card for the officer's club at Clark Field.  On March 9, Foster Dulles, the secretary of state, and the brother of DI Allen Dulles, made a public statement calling for a revolt against communist despotism under Sukarno.  Three days later the CIA reported to the White House that the Indonesian Army's actions against CIA backed Permesta revolution was suppressing communism.

After Indonesia, Eisenhower displayed mistrust of the CIA and its Director, Allen Dulles.  Allen Dulles too displayed mistrust of the CIA itself.  Abbot Smith, a CIA analyst who would rise to the position of chief of the Office of National Estimates, said "We had constructed for ourselves a picture of the USSR, and whatever happened had to be made to fit into this picture.  Intelligence estimators can hardly commit a more abominable sin."  Something reflected in the intelligence failure in Indonesia.  On December 16, Eisenhower received a report from his intelligence board of consultants that said that the agency was "incapable of making objective appraisals of its own intelligence information as well as its own operations."

Congo

In the election of Patrice Lumumba, and his acceptance of Soviet support the CIA saw another possible Cuba.  This view swayed the White House.  Eisenhower ordered that Lumumba be "eliminated".  The CIA delivered a quarter of a million dollars to Joseph Mobutu, their favorite horse in the race.  Mobutu delivered Lumumba to the Belgians, the former colonial masters of Congo, who executed him in short order.

Gary Powers U-2 Shootdown

After the Bomber gap came the Missile gap.  Eisenhower wanted to use the U-2 to disprove the missile gap, but he had banned U-2 overflights of the USSR after the successful meeting at Camp David with Nikita Khrushchev.  Another reason Eisenhower objected to the use of the U-2 was that, in the nuclear age, the intelligence he needed most was on their intentions, without which, the U.S. would face a paralysis of intelligence.  Eisenhower was particularly worried that U-2 flights could be seen as the preparation for first strike attacks as he had high hopes for an upcoming meeting with Khrushchev in Paris.  Conflicted, Eisenhower finally gave into CIA pressure to authorize a 16-day window for flights, which, because of poor weather, was later extended for another six days.  On May 1, 1960 the USSR shot down a U-2 flying over the USSR.  To Ike, the ensuing coverup destroyed one of his biggest assets, his perceived honesty, and the biggest hope he had, leaving a legacy of thawing relations with Khrushchev.  It also marked the beginning of a long downward slide in the credibility of the Office of the President of the United States.  Eisenhower later said that the U-2 coverup was the greatest regret of his Presidency.

Dominican Republic
The human rights abuses of Generalissimo Rafael Trujillo had a history of more than three decades, but in August 1960 the United States severed diplomatic relations.  The CIA's Special Group had decided to arm Dominicans in hopes of an assassination.  The CIA had dispersed three rifles, and three .38 revolvers, but things paused as President John F. Kennedy assumed office.  An order approved by Kennedy resulted in the dispersal of four machine guns.  Trujillo died from gunshot wounds two weeks later.  In the aftermath Robert Kennedy wrote that the CIA had succeeded where it had failed many times in the past, but in the face of that success, it was caught flatfooted, having failed to plan what to do next.

Cuba

The CIA welcomed Fidel Castro on his visit to DC, and gave him a face to face briefing.  The CIA hoped that Castro would bring about a friendly democratic government, and planned to curry his favor with money and guns.  On December 11, 1959, a memo reached the DI's desk recommending Castro's "elimination".  Dulles replaced the word "elimination" with "removal", and set the wheels in motion.  By mid August 1960, Richard Bissell (then CIA's Deputy Director for Plans) sought, with the blessing of the CIA, to hire the Mafia to assassinate Castro.  At the same time, his men were working on a parallel plan, recruiting a Cuban exile to assassinate him.  A little while later, the FBI advised the CIA that it would be impossible to overthrow Castro with these chatty Cuban exiles.  In the days before the Bay of Pigs, and during the invasion Richard Bissell lied to everyone.  He lied to Adlai Stevenson, he lied to the people commanding the mission, guaranteeing them air support while he lied to the President, promising success, and minimal air support.

The Taylor Board was commissioned to determine what went wrong in Cuba.  The Board came to the same conclusion that the January 1961 President's Board of Consultants on Foreign Intelligence Activities had concluded, and many other reviews prior, and to come, that Covert Action had to be completely isolated from intelligence and analysis.  The Inspector General of the CIA investigated the Bay of Pigs.  His conclusion was that there was a need to drastically improve the organization and management of the CIA.  The Special Group (later renamed the 303 committee) was convened in an oversight role.

Cuban Missile Crisis

Subsequent to the shoot-downs of the may day U-2 reconnaissance plane, and a later shoot down in China, Kennedy ordered a 45-day cessation of U-2 flights, including flights over Cuba that had recently discovered the first Soviet high altitude Surface to Air Missile launcher site.  There were fears of antagonism, and an election was around the corner.  During this "photo gap" the CIA received a report from a source from Operation Mongoose, a road watcher describing covered tractor trailers moving that were shaped like large telephone poles.  Control of U-2 flights was moved to the Air Force, and October 14 U-2 flights resumed.  The Cuban Missile Crisis formally started the next day when American photo analysts identified R-12 1 Megaton MRBMs which could target parts of the east coast with its 2,000 km range.  R-14s which could target most of the continental US, as well as 9M21 tactical nukes had also been deployed.

Early Cold War, 1953–1966

Concern regarding the Soviet Union and the difficulty of getting information from its closed society, which few agents could penetrate, led to solutions based on advanced technology. Among the first successes was the Lockheed U-2 aircraft, which could take pictures and collect electronic signals from an altitude thought to be above Soviet air defenses' reach.  The CIA, working with the military, formed the joint National Reconnaissance Office (NRO) to operate reconnaissance aircraft such as the SR-71 and later satellites. "The fact of" the United States operating reconnaissance satellites, like "the fact of" the existence of NRO, was highly classified for many years.

The CIA was credited with assisting in anti-Communist efforts in Burma, Guatemala, and Laos. There have been suggestions that the Soviet attempt to put missiles into Cuba came, indirectly, when they realized how badly they had been compromised by a U.S.-UK defector in place, Oleg Penkovsky. One of the biggest operations ever undertaken by the CIA was directed at Zaïre in support of Mobutu Sese Seko.

Indochina, Tibet and the Vietnam War (1954–1975)

The OSS Patti mission arrived in Vietnam near the end of World War II, and had significant interaction with the leaders of many Vietnamese factions, including Ho Chi Minh. While the Patti mission forwarded Ho's proposals for phased independence, with the French or even the United States as the transition partner, the US policy of containment opposed forming any government that was communist in nature.

The first CIA mission to Indochina, under the code name "Saigon Military Mission" arrived in 1954, under Edward Lansdale. U.S.-based analysts were simultaneously trying to project the evolution of political power, both if the scheduled referendum chose merger of the North and South, or if the South, the U.S. client, stayed independent. Initially, the US focus in Southeast Asia was on Laos, not Vietnam.

The CIA Tibetan program consists of political plots, propaganda distribution, as well as  paramilitary and intelligence gathering based on U.S. commitments made to the Dalai Lama in 1951 and 1956.

During the period of U.S. combat involvement in the Vietnam War, there was considerable argument about progress among the Department of Defense under Robert McNamara, the CIA, and, to some extent, the intelligence staff of Military Assistance Command Vietnam. In general, the military was consistently more optimistic than the CIA. Sam Adams, a junior CIA analyst with responsibilities for estimating the actual damage to the enemy, eventually resigned from the CIA, after expressing concern to Director of Central Intelligence Richard Helms with estimates that were changed for inter-agency and White House political reasons. Adams afterward wrote the book War of Numbers.

Sometime between 1959 and 1961 the CIA started Project Tiger, a program of dropping South Vietnamese agents into North Vietnam to gather intelligence.  These were a tragic failure; the Deputy Chief for Project Tiger, Captain Do Van Tien, admitted that he was an agent for Hanoi.

President Ngo Dinh Diem's Government, however, continued its unofficial policy of violently repressing the Buddhist majority.  On August 23, 1963, after being approached by a South Vietnamese General, John F. Kennedy ordered the newly appointed 5th U.S. Ambassador to South Vietnam to make detailed plans for Diem's replacement. The CIA's 4th DI John McCone compared Diem to a bad pitcher, saying that it would be unwise to get rid of him unless you could replace him with a better one.  Kennedy's Cabinet was dubious about the coup, and JFK would come to regret it.  This 5th U.S. Ambassador Henry Cabot Lodge Jr., a longtime political opponent of JFK, was jealous that the CIA station had more money, power, and people than his own staff. The CIA Chief of Station Vietnam, John H. Richardson Sr, for his part, shared his director's skepticism, was still opposed to a coup. Thus developed the 'Lodge-Richardson Feud'. That feud came to a climax when Lodge revealed the name of his rival, John H. Richardson (CIA), to a reporter, Richard Starnes, branding him – and also 'outing' him – as an agent of the CIA; after the 'outed' Richardson is recalled to Langley, Virginia, Lodge completed the feud by later moving into Richardson's Saigon house, which was larger than the one Lodge had been in.

The coup occurred on 1 November 1963.

Johnson

The assassination of Diem sparked a cascade of coups in Saigon, and at the same time the city was wracked with assassinations.  Lyndon B. Johnson, the new President, wanted to refocus the CIA on intelligence, rather than covert action, while the Kennedys were seen as relentless in their hounding of the CIA to produce results, Johnson soon gave them only the most minimal attention.

In the face of the failure of Project Tiger, the Pentagon wanted CIA paramilitary forces to participate in their Op Plan 64A, this resulted in the CIA's foreign paramilitaries being put under the command of the DOD, a move seen as a slippery slope inside the CIA, a slide from covert action towards militarization.  After touring Vietnam in 1964, DI McCone and Secretary of Defense McNamara had different views of the U.S. position. McCone believed that as long as the Ho Chi Minh trail was active the U.S. would struggle.

DI McCone had statutory control over all intelligence committees, but in reality, but the military had near total control of the DIA, the NRO, the NSA, and many other aspects. Importantly, President Johnson almost completely ignored the CIA. In effect, the military controlled the two-thirds of the CIA budget laid out for covert action. McCone, the unspoken hero of the Cuban Missile Crisis, submitted his resignation in the summer, but Johnson would not accept it until after the election.

On August 4, Secretary of Defense McNamara gave President Johnson the raw translation of intercepted Korean transmissions directly from the NSA which, ostensibly, reported to DI McCone, rather than to McNamara. It was later determined that the transmission took place before the weapon discharges that night which leads to the conclusion that the transmission refers to the events of the attack the day before, and that, although Destroyers Maddox, and Turner Joy fired hundreds of shells at intermittent radar contacts, they were firing at false returns.

A CIA analyst's assessment of Vietnam was that the U.S. was "becoming progressively divorced from reality... [and] proceeding with far more courage than wisdom".  The CIA had created an exhaustive report, "The Vietnamese Communist's Will to Persist".  This created a key flashpoint in the US government, PAVN troop levels,.  Was it 500k or more as the CIA believed, or 300k or less as the commanders of US forces in Vietnam believed.  The argument went on for months, but Helms finally OK'd a report saying that PAVN troop levels were 299,000 or less.  The DOD argument was that whatever the facts on the ground, to publicly admit any higher number could be the last nail in the coffin of the war for vietnam in the press.

Nixon
In 1971 the NSA and CIA were engaged in domestic spying.  The Department of Defense was eavesdropping on Henry Kissinger.  The White House, and Camp David were wired for sound.  Nixon and Kissenger were eavesdropping on their aides and on reporters. Nixon's "plumbers" included former CIA officials Howard Hunt and Jim McCord.  On July 7, 1971, John Ehrlichman, Nixon's domestic policy chief, told DCI Cushman, Nixon's hatchet-man in the CIA, to let Cushman "know that [Hunt] was in fact doing some things for the President... you should consider he has pretty much carte blanche"  Importantly, this included a camera, disguises, a voice altering device, and ID papers furnished by the CIA, as well as the CIA's participation developing film from the burglary Hunt staged on the office of Pentagon Papers leaker Daniel Ellsberg's psychologist.

On June 17, Nixon's Plumbers were caught burglarizing the Democratic National Committee offices in the Watergate.  On June 23, DI Helms was ordered by the White House to wave the FBI off using national security as a pretext.  The new DCI, Walters, another Nixon hack, told the acting director of the FBI and told him to drop the investigation as ordered.  On June 26, Nixon's counsel John Dean ordered DCI Walters to pay the plumbers untraceable hush money.  The CIA was the only part of the government that had the power to make off the book payments, but it could only be done on the orders of the CI, or, if he was out of the country, the DCI.  The Acting Director of the FBI started breaking ranks.  He demanded the CIA produce a signed document attesting to the national security threat of the investigation.  Jim McCord's lawyer contacted the CIA informing them that McCord had been offered a Presidential pardon if he fingered the CIA, testifying that the break-in had been an operation of the CIA.  Nixon had long been frustrated by what he saw as a liberal infection inside the CIA, and had been trying for years to tear the CIA out by its roots.  McCord wrote "If [DI] Helms goes (takes the fall) and the Watergate operation is laid at the CIA's feet, where it does not belong, every tree in the forest will fall.  It will be a scorched desert."

On November 13, after Nixon's landslide re-election, Nixon told Kissinger "[I intend] to ruin the Foreign Service.  I mean ruin it – the old Foreign Service – and to build a new one."  He had similar designs for the CIA, and intended to replace Helms with James Schlesinger.  Nixon had told Helms that he was on the way out, and promised that Helms could stay on until his 60th birthday, the mandatory retirement age.  On February 2, Nixon broke that promise, carrying through with his intention to "remove the deadwood" from the CIA.  "Get rid of the clowns" was his order to the incoming CI.  Kissinger had been running the CIA since the beginning of Nixon's presidency, but Nixon impressed on Schlesinger that he must appear to congress to be in charge, averting their suspicion of Kissinger's involvement.  Nixon also hoped that Schlesinger could push through broader changes in the intelligence community that he had been working towards for years, the creation of a Director of National Intelligence, and spinning off the covert action part of the CIA into a separate organ.  Before Helms left office, he destroyed every tape he had secretly made of meetings in his office, and many of the papers on Project MKUltra.  In Schlesinger's 17-week tenure, he fired more than 1,500 employees.  As Watergate threw the spotlight on the CIA, Schlesinger, who had been kept in the dark about the CIA's involvement, decided he needed to know what skeletons were in the closet.  He issued a memo to every CIA employee directing them to disclose to him any CIA activity they knew of past or present that could fall outside the scope of the CIA's charter.

This became the Family Jewels.  It included information linking the CIA to the assassination of foreign leaders, the illegal surveillance of some 7,000 U.S. citizens involved in the antiwar movement (Operation CHAOS), the CIA had also experimented on U.S. and Canadian citizens without their knowledge, secretly giving them LSD (among other things) and observing the results.  This prompted Congress to create the Church Committee in the Senate, and the Pike Committee in the House.  President Gerald Ford created the Rockefeller Commission, and issued an executive order prohibiting the assassination of foreign leaders.  DCI Colby leaked the papers to the press, later he stated that he believed that providing Congress with this information was the correct thing to do, and in the CIA's own interests.

Congressional investigations

Acting Attorney General Laurence Silberman learned of the existence of the family jewels, he issued a subpoena for them, prompting eight congressional investigations on the domestic spying activities of the CIA.  Bill Colby's short tenure as DCI ended with the Halloween Massacre.  His replacement was George H. W. Bush.  At the time, the Department of Defense (DOD) had control of 80% of the intelligence budget.  With Donald Rumsfeld as Secretary of Defense communication and coordination between the CIA and the DOD suffered greatly.  The CIA's budget for hiring clandestine officers had been squeezed out by the paramilitary operations in south-east Asia, and hiring was further strained by the government's poor popularity.  This left the agency bloated with middle management, and anemic in younger officers.  Yet again, with employee training taking five years, the agency's only hope would be on the trickle of new officers coming to fruition years in the future.  The CIA faced another setback as communists took Angola.  William J. Casey, a member of Ford's Intelligence Advisory Board, pressed Bush to allow a team from outside the CIA to produce Soviet military estimates as a "Team B".  Bush gave the OK.  The "B" team was composed of hawks.  Their estimates were the highest that could be at all justified, and they painted a picture of a growing Soviet military when the reality was that the Soviet military was shrinking.  Many of their reports found their way to the Press.  As a result of the investigations Congressional oversight of the CIA evolved into a select intelligence committee in the House, and Senate supervising covert actions authorized by the President.

Chad
Chad's neighbor Libya was a major source of weaponry to communist rebel forces.  The CIA seized the opportunity to arm and finance Chad's Prime Minister, Hissène Habré after he created a breakaway government in Western Sudan, even giving him Stinger missiles.

Afghanistan

In Afghanistan, the CIA funneled a billion dollars worth of weapons to Pakistani intelligence, which funneled them through Pakistani tribes, which funneled them to Afghan resistance groups, notably the Mujahideen.  At each step, some of the weapons were held back.

Iran Contra
Under President Jimmy Carter, the CIA was conducting covertly funding pro-American opposition against the Sandinista National Liberation Front.  In March 1981, Reagan told Congress that the CIA would protect El Salvador by preventing the shipment of Nicaraguan arms into the country to arm Communist rebels.  This was a ruse.  The CIA was actually arming and training Nicaraguans Contras in Honduras in hopes that they could depose the Sandinistas in Nicaragua.  Through William J. Casey's tenure as DI little of what he said in the National Security Planning Group, or to President Reagan was supported by the intelligence branch of the CIA, so Casey formed the Central American Task Force, staffed with yes men from Covert Action.  On December 21, 1982, Congress passed a law restricting the CIA to its stated mission, restricting the flow of arms from Nicaragua to El Salvador, prohibiting the use of funds to oust the Sandinistas.  Reagan testified before Congress, assuring them that the CIA was not trying to topple the Nicaraguan government.

During this time, with funding increases, the CIA hired 2,000 new employees, but these new recruits lacked the experience of the World War II vets they replaced, living in the theaters where the war was fought, Europe, Africa, the Middle East, and Asia.

Hostage taking
For more than a decade, hostage taking had plagued the Middle East. The CIA's best source of information there was Hassan Salameh, the Palestine Liberation Organization's (PLO) Chief of Intelligence, until Israel assassinated him.  Through Salameh, the CIA gained a foothold in the world of Muslim extremism, and had entered a bargain where Americans would be safe, and the PLO and CIA would share information on mutual enemies.

Lebanon
The CIA's prime source in Lebanon was Bashir Gemayel, a member of the Christian Maronite sect.  The CIA was blinded by the uprising against the Maronite minority.  Israel invaded Lebanon, and, along with the CIA, propped up Gemayel; this got Gemayel's assurance that Americans would be protected in Lebanon.  13 days later he was assassinated.  Imad Mughniyah, a Hezbollah assassin, targeted Americans in retaliation for the Israeli invasion, the Sabra and Shatila massacre, and the US Marines of the Multi-National Force for their role in opposing the PLO in Lebanon.  On April 18, 1983, a 2,000 lb car bomb exploded in the lobby of the American embassy in Beirut, killing 63 people, including 17 Americans and 7 CIA officers, among whom was Bob Ames, one of the CIA's best Middle East experts.  America's fortunes in Lebanon only suffered more as America's poorly directed retaliation for the bombing was interpreted by many as support for the Christian Maronite minority.  On October 23, 1983, two bombs were detonated in Beirut, including a 10-ton bomb at a US military barracks that killed 242 people.  Both attacks are believed to have been planned by Iran by way of Mughniyah.

The Embassy bombing had taken the life of the CIA's Beirut Station Chief, Ken Haas. Bill Buckley was sent in to replace him.  Eighteen days after the U.S. Marines left Lebanon, Bill Buckley was kidnapped.  On March 7, 1984, Jeremy Levin, CNN Bureau Chief in Beirut.  12 more Americans were kidnapped in Beirut during the Reagan administration.  Manucher Ghorbanifar, a former Savak agent.  He was an information seller, and the subject of a rare CIA burn notice for his track record of misinformation.  He reached out to the agency offering a back channel to Iran, suggesting a trade of missiles that would be lucrative to the intermediaries.

Nicaragua
With the CIA's paramilitary forces overextended in Central America, they turned to former Special Forces soldiers, one of whom had an old comic book that had, in Vietnam, been used to teach natives how to take control of a village by assassinating the mayor, chief of police, and militia.  The CIA translated this into Spanish, and distributed it to the Contras.  This shortly became public.  The CIA also mined the port of Corinto, an act of war that resulted in a public trial in the International Court of Justice.  These two public incidents led Congress to clamp down on CIA funding even more, banning them from soliciting funds from third parties to fund the Contras.

Hostage trades
At Reagan's second inaugural, the two most pressing issues for the CIA were the Contras and the hostages.  On June 14, 1985, Hezbollah took TWA Flight 847, and executed an American Navy diver on the tarmac of Beirut Airport.  Reagan negotiated a trade of prisoners for hostages.  This paved the way for a trade of 504 TOW missiles to Iran for $10,000 each, and the release of Benjamin Weir, a captive of Islamic Jihad, the group that claimed responsibility for the Beirut bombings which later became Hezbollah.  This broke two of the public pillars of Reagan's foreign policy: no deals with terrorists, and no arms to Iran.

Ghorbanifar sent word that the six remaining hostages in exchange for thousands of Hawk missiles.  A Boeing 707 with 18 Hawk missiles landed at Tehran from Tel Aviv with Hebrew markings on the crates.  The CIA realized on that day, October 25, that they needed a signed presidential order to authorize the shipment.  A month later Reagan would sign an order retroactively authorizing it.  $850,000 of the transaction went to Contras.  In July 1986, Hezbollah was holding four American hostages, trading them for arms.  Six months later, they had 12 American hostages.  On October 5, 1986, an American C-123 full of weapons was shot down by a Nicaraguan soldier.  The sole survivor was an American cargo handler who said that he was working for the CIA.  On November 3, anonymous leaflets were scattered in Tehran revealing the Iran connection.  The Iran Contra Affair broke.  Oliver North and John Poindexter had been shredding documents for weeks, but a memo about suspicions that Secord was taking more than his agreed cut surfaced.  DI Bill Casey had a seizure and was hospitalized, to be replaced by Judge Webster, clearly brought in to clean house.

Operation Desert Storm
During the Iran-Iraq war, the CIA had backed both sides.  The CIA had maintained a network of spies in Iran, but in 1989 a CIA mistake compromised every agent they had in there, and the CIA had no agents in Iraq.  In the weeks before the Invasion of Kuwait the CIA downplayed the military buildup.  During the war CIA estimates of Iraqi abilities and intentions flip-flopped and were rarely accurate.  In one particular case, the DOD had asked the CIA to identify military targets to bomb.  One target the CIA identified was an underground shelter.  The CIA didn't know that it was a civilian bomb shelter.  In a rare instance the CIA correctly determined that the coalition forces efforts were coming up short in their efforts to destroy SCUD missiles.  Congress took away the CIA's role in interpreting spy-satellite photos, putting the CIA's satellite intelligence operations under the auspices of the military.  The CIA created its office of military affairs, which operated as "second-echelon support for the pentagon... answering... questions from military men [like] 'how wide is this road?'"  At the end of the war, the CIA reported that there could be an uprising against Saddam, based on intelligence gained from exiles.  Former DI, and current President Bush called on the Shiites and Kurds to rise up against Saddam, while, at the same time, withdrawing any support against Saddam.  Saddam crushed the uprisings brutally.  After the war, Saddam's nuclear program was discovered.  The CIA had had no information about it.

Fall of the USSR
Gorbachev's announcement of the unilateral reduction of 500,000 Soviet troops took the CIA by surprise.  What's more, Doug MacEachin, the CIA's Chief of Soviet analysis said that even if the CIA had told the President, the NSC, and Congress about the cuts beforehand, it would have been ignored.  "We never would have been able to publish it."  All the CIA numbers on the USSR's economy were wrong.  Too often the CIA relied on people inexperienced with that which they were supposed to be the expert.  Bob Gates had preceded Doug MacEachin as Chief of Soviet analysis, and he had never visited Russia.  Few officers, even those stationed in country spoke the language of the people they were spying on.  And the CIA had no capacity to send agents to respond to developing situations.  The CIA analysis of Russia during the entire cold war was either driven by ideology, or by politics.  William J Crowe, the Chairman of the Joint Chiefs of Staff noted that the CIA "talked about the Soviet Union as if they weren't reading the newspapers, much less developed clandestine intelligence."  The CIA was even caught unprepared when the Berlin Wall fell.  Once again, CNN had scooped the CIA.

One of the first acts of Bob Gates, the new DI, was National Security Review 29, a memo to each member of the Cabinet asking them what they wanted from the CIA.  Starting in 1991 the CIA faced six years of budget cuts.  The CIA closed 20 stations, and cut its staff in some major capitals by 60%.  The CIA could still not shake the perennial analysis, that it was five years away from being able to perform its basic duties satisfactorily.

President Clinton

On January 25, 1993, there was a shooting at the headquarters of the CIA in Langley Virginia. Mir Qazi killed two agents and wounded three others.  On February 26, Omar Abdel Rahman bombed the parking garage of the World Trade Center in New York City, killing six people, and wounding a thousand.  Of Rahman, the "Blind Sheik"'s seven applications to enter the United States, the CIA had given the OK six times.

In Bosnia the CIA ignored signs within and without of the Srebrenica massacre.  Two weeks after news reports of the slaughter, the CIA sent a U-2 to photograph it, a week later the CIA completed its report on the matter.  During Operation Allied Force, the CIA had incorrectly provided the coordinates of the Chinese Embassy as a military target resulting in its bombing.

In France, the CIA had orders for economic intelligence, a female CIA agent revealed her connections to the CIA to the French.  Dick Holm, Paris Station Chief, was expelled.  In Guatemala, the CIA produced the Murphy Memo, based on audio recordings made by bugs planted in the bedroom of Ambassador Marilyn McAfee placed by Guatemalan intelligence.  In the recording, Ambassador McAfee verbally entreated "Murphy".  The CIA circulated a memo in the highest Washington circles accusing Ambassador McAfee of having an extramarital lesbian affair with her secretary, Carol Murphy.  There was no affair.  Ambassador McAfee was calling to Murphy, her poodle.  The CIA was still bucking the reigns of Congress, Presidents, and DCIs that had ordered that ties of the CIA to harsh regimes that had stood for decades be broken.  In Iraq, under Clinton's orders, the CIA was trying to form a coup.  The plot was compromised, Saddam arrested over 200 of his own officers, executing over 80.  Again this was a case where the NSC wanted CI to give them answers they didn't have, and to make decisions for the NSC that neither the NSC, nor CI could make.  Clinton wanted a coup in Iraq, and wanted him to be replaced by someone aligned with the US, but if that US friendly officer existed, neither the CIA nor NSC knew him.

Harold James Nicholson burned several serving officers and three years of trainees before he was caught spying for Russia.  In 1997 the House wrote another report, which said that CIA officers know little about the language or politics of the people they spy on, the conclusion was that the CIA lacked the "depth, breadth, and expertise to monitor political, military, and economic developments worldwide."  There was a new voice in the CIA to counterpoint the endless chant that the CIA was five years away from success.  Russ Travers said in the CIA in-house journal that in five years "intelligence failure is inevitable".  In 1997 the CIA's new director George Tenet promised a new working agency by 2002.  The CIA's surprise at India's detonation of an atom bomb was a failure at almost every level.  After the 1998 embassy bombings by Al Qaeda, the CIA offered two targets to be hit in retaliation.  One of them was a chemical plant where traces of chemical weapon precursors had been detected.  In the aftermath it was concluded that "the decision to target al Shifa continues a tradition of operating on inadequate intelligence about Sudan."  It triggered the CIA to make "substantial and sweeping changes" to prevent "a catasrophic systemic intelligence failure."  Between 1991 and 1998 the CIA had lost 3,000 employees.

Somalia
Half a million people had starved in Somalia when President George H. W. Bush ordered U.S. troops to enter the country on a humanitarian mission.  As clans started fighting over the aid, the humanitarian mission quickly became a struggle against Mohamed Farah Aideed.  The CIA station in Somalia had been shuttered for two years.  The CIA was given an impossible mission in Somalia, as was the military.  Casualties came quickly and were high in the eight man team the CIA sent.  A post mortem carried out by now FISA member Admiral Crowe stated that the National Security Council had expected the CIA to both make decisions, and give them the intelligence to base those decisions on.  The NSC couldn't understand why intelligence didn't advise them correctly on what to do.  Bill Clinton entered the ranks of Presidents unhappy with the results of the CIA; Clinton's inattention to the CIA did not help the matter.

Aldrich Ames

Between 1985 and 1986 the CIA lost every spy it had in Eastern Europe.  The details of the investigation into the cause was obscured from the new Director, and the investigation had little success, and has been widely criticized.  In June 1987, Major Florentino Aspillaga Lombard, the chief of Cuban Intelligence in Czechoslovakia drove into Vienna, and walked into the American Embassy to defect.  He revealed that every single Cuban spy on the CIA payroll was a double agent, pretending to work for the CIA, but secretly still being loyal to Castro.  On February 21, 1994, FBI agents pulled Aldrich Ames out of his Jaguar.  If there was a posterboy for failing upwards inside the CIA, he was it.  In the investigation that ensued, the CIA discovered that many of the sources for its most important analyses of the USSR were based on soviet disinformation fed to the CIA by controlled agents.  On top of that, it was discovered that, in some cases, the CIA suspected at the time that the sources were compromised, but the information was sent up the chain as genuine.  This prompted a congressional committee in 1994 to address what was widely seen as a fundamentally broken institution.  The committee quickly became a quagmire.  When the committee submitted its toothless report, the CIA had 25 recruits entering its two-year training program, the smallest class of recruits ever.   As it had for most of its existence, the CIA suffered from poor management, poor morale, and a lack of employees familiar with the people they were spying on.

Yugoslavia

Kosovo
The United States (and NATO) directly supported the Kosovo Liberation Army (KLA). The CIA funded, trained and supplied the KLA (as they had earlier the Bosnian Army). As disclosed to The Sunday Times by CIA sources, "American intelligence agents have admitted they helped to train the Kosovo Liberation Army before NATO's bombing of Yugoslavia". In 1999, a retired Colonel told that KLA forces had been trained in Albania by former US military working for MPRI. James Bissett, Canadian Ambassador to Yugoslavia, Bulgaria and Albania, wrote in 2001 that media reports indicate that "as early as 1998, the Central Intelligence Agency assisted by the British Special Air Service were arming and training Kosovo Liberation Army members in Albania to foment armed rebellion in Kosovo. (...) The hope was that with Kosovo in flames NATO could intervene ...".

The KLA was largely funded through narcotics trafficking. When the US State Department at first listed the KLA as a terrorist organization in 1998 (later revoked), it noted its links to the heroin trade, and a briefing paper for the US Congress stated: "We would be remiss to dismiss allegations that between 30 and 50 percent of the KLA's money comes from drugs." By 1999, Western intelligence agencies estimated that over $250m of narcotics money had found its way into KLA coffers. After the NATO bombing of 1999, KLA-linked heroin traffickers again began using Kosovo as a major supply route; in 2000, an estimated 80% of Europe's heroin supply was controlled by Kosovar Albanians.

Alex Roslin of the Montreal Gazette summarized evidence indicating CIA complicity to KLA's funding from heroin trade. Former DEA agent Michael Levine said "…They (the CIA) protected them (the KLA) in every way they could. As long as the CIA is protecting the KLA, you've got major drug pipelines protected from any police investigation".

Osama Bin Laden

Agency files show that it is believed Osama Bin Laden was funding the Afghan rebels against the USSR in the '80s. Allegations of CIA assistance to Osama bin Laden in the early 80s have been presented by some sources and politicians, including UK foreign secretary Robin Cook. Prince Bandar bin Sultan of Saudi Arabia, has also stated that bin Laden once expressed appreciation for the United States' help in Afghanistan. However U.S. government officials and a number of other parties maintain that the U.S. supported only the indigenous Afghan mujahideen.

In 1991, Bin Laden returned to his native Saudi Arabia protesting the presence of troops, and Operation Desert Storm. He was expelled from the country. In 1996 the CIA created a team to hunt Bin Laden. They were trading information with the Sudanese until, on the word of a source that was later found to be a fabricator, the CIA closed its Sudan station later that year. In 1998 Bin Laden declared war on America, and, on August 7, struck in Tanzania and Nairobi. In 1947 when the CIA was founded, there were 200 agents in the Clandestine Service. In 2001, of the 17,000 employees in the CIA, there were 1,000 in the Clandestine Service. Of that 1,000 few accepted hardship postings. In the first days of George W. Bush's Presidency, Al Qaeda threats were ubiquitous in daily Presidential CIA briefings, but it may have become a case of the boy who cries wolf. The agency's predictions were dire, but carried little weight, and the attentions of the President, and his defense staff were elsewhere. The CIA arranged the arrests of suspected Al Qaeda members through cooperation with foreign agencies, but the CIA could not definitively say what effect these arrests had, and it could not gain hard intelligence from those captured. The President had asked the CIA if Al Qaeda could plan attacks in the US. On August 6, Bush received a daily briefing with the headline, not based on current, solid intelligence, "Al Qaeda determined to strike inside the U.S." The U.S. had been hunting Bin Laden since 1996 and had had several opportunities, but neither Clinton nor Bush had wanted to risk taking an active role in a murky assassination plot, and the perfect opportunity had never materialized for a trigger-shy DI that would have given him the reassurances he needed to take the plunge. That day, Richard A. Clarke sent National Security Advisor Condoleezza Rice warning of the risks, and decrying the inaction of the CIA.

Al-Qaeda and the "Global War on Terrorism"

The CIA had long been dealing with terrorism originating from abroad, and in 1986 had set up a Counterterrorist Center to deal specifically with the problem. At first confronted with secular terrorism, the Agency found Islamist terrorism looming increasingly large on its scope.

In January 1996, the CIA created an experimental "virtual station," the Bin Laden Issue Station, under the Counterterrorist Center, to track Bin Laden's developing activities.  Al-Fadl, who defected to the CIA in spring 1996, began to provide the Station with a new image of the Al Qaeda leader: he was not only a terrorist financier, but a terrorist organizer, too. FBI Special Agent Dan Coleman (who together with his partner Jack Cloonan had been "seconded" to the Bin Laden Station) called him Qaeda's "Rosetta Stone".

In 1999, CIA chief George Tenet launched a grand "Plan" to deal with al-Qaeda.  The Counterterrorist Center, its new chief Cofer Black and the center's Bin Laden unit were the Plan's developers and executors.  Once it was prepared Tenet assigned CIA intelligence chief Charles E. Allen to set up a "Qaeda cell" to oversee its tactical execution.  In 2000, the CIA and USAF jointly ran a series of flights over Afghanistan with a small remote-controlled reconnaissance drone, the Predator; they obtained probable photos of Bin Laden.  Cofer Black and others became advocates of arming the Predator with missiles to try to assassinate Bin Laden and other al-Qaeda leaders.  After the Cabinet-level Principals Committee meeting on terrorism of September 4, 2001, the CIA resumed reconnaissance flights, the drones now being weapons-capable.

Post 9/11:

Soon after 9/11, The New York Times released a story stating that the CIA's New York field office was destroyed in the wake of the attacks. According to unnamed CIA sources, while first responders were conducting rescue efforts, a special CIA team was searching the rubble for both digital and paper copies of classified documents. This was done according to well-rehearsed document recovery procedures put in place after the Iranian takeover of the United States Embassy in Tehran in 1979. While it was not confirmed whether the agency was able to retrieve the classified information, it is known that all agents present that day fled the building safely.

While the CIA insists that those who conducted the attacks on 9/11 were not aware that the agency was operating at 7 World Trade Center under the guise of another (unidentified) federal agency, this center was the headquarters for many notable criminal terrorism investigations. Though the New York field offices' main responsibilities were to monitor and recruit foreign officials stationed at the United Nations, the field office also handled the investigations of the August 1998 bombings of United States Embassies in East Africa and the October 2000 bombing of the USS Cole. Despite the fact that the CIA's New York branch may have been damaged by the 9/11 attacks and they had to loan office space from the US Mission to the United Nations and other federal agencies, there was an upside for the CIA. In the months immediately following 9/11, there was a huge increase in the number of applications for CIA positions. According to CIA representatives that spoke with the New York Times, pre-9/11 the agency received approximately 500 to 600 applications a week, in the months following 9/11 the agency received that number daily.

The intelligence community as a whole, and especially the CIA, were involved in presidential planning immediately after the 9/11 attacks. In his address to the nation at 8:30pm on September 11, 2001 George W. Bush mentioned the intelligence community: "The search is underway for those who are behind these evil acts, I've directed the full resource of our intelligence and law enforcement communities to find those responsible and bring them to justice."

The involvement of the CIA in the newly coined "War on Terror" was further increased on September 15, 2001. During a meeting at Camp David George W. Bush agreed to adopt a plan proposed by CIA director George Tenet. This plan consisted of conducting a covert war in which CIA paramilitary officers would cooperate with anti-Taliban guerillas inside Afghanistan. They would later be joined by small special operations forces teams which would call in precision airstrikes on Taliban and Al Qaeda fighters. This plan was codified on September 16, 2001 with Bush's signature of an official Memorandum of Notification that allowed the plan to proceed.

On November 25–27, 2001 Taliban prisoners revolt at the Qala Jangi prison west of Mazar-e-Sharif. Though several days of struggle occurred between the Taliban prisoners and the Northern Alliance members present, the prisoners did gain the upper hand and obtain North Alliance weapons. At some point during this period Johnny "Mike" Spann, a CIA officer sent to question the prisoners, was beaten to death. He became the first American to die in combat in the war in Afghanistan.

After 9/11, the CIA came under criticism for not having done enough to prevent the attacks.  Tenet rejected the criticism, citing the Agency's planning efforts especially over the preceding two years.  He also considered that the CIA's efforts had put the Agency in a position to respond rapidly and effectively to the attacks, both in the "Afghan sanctuary" and in "ninety-two countries around the world".  The new strategy was called the "Worldwide Attack Matrix".

Anwar al-Awlaki, a Yemeni-American U.S. citizen and al-Qaeda member, was killed on September 30, 2011, by an air attack carried out by the Joint Special Operations Command. After several days of surveillance of Awlaki by the Central Intelligence Agency, armed drones took off from a new, secret American base in the Arabian Peninsula, crossed into northern Yemen, and fired a number of Hellfire missiles at al-Awlaki's vehicle. Samir Khan, a Pakistani-American al-Qaeda member and editor of the jihadist Inspire magazine, also reportedly died in the attack.  The combined CIA/JSOC drone strike was the first in Yemen since 2002 – there have been others by the military's Special Operations forces – and was part of an effort by the spy agency to duplicate in Yemen the covert war which has been running in Afghanistan and Pakistan.

Use of vaccination programs
The agency attracted widespread criticism after it used a doctor in Pakistan to set up a vaccination program in Abbottabad in 2011 to obtain DNA samples from the occupants of a compound where it was suspected bin Laden was living.  Subsequently in May 2014 a counterterrorism advisor to President Obama wrote to deans of 13 prominent public health schools giving an undertaking the CIA would not engage in vaccination programs or engage U.S. or non-U.S. health workers in immunization arrangements for espionage purposes.

Failures in intelligence analysis

A major criticism is failure to forestall the September 11 attacks.  The 9/11 Commission Report identifies failures in the IC as a whole. One problem, for example, was the FBI failing to "connect the dots" by sharing information among its decentralized field offices.

The report concluded that former DCI George Tenet failed to adequately prepare the agency to deal with the danger posed by al-Qaeda prior to the attacks of September 11, 2001. The report was finished in June 2005 and was partially released to the public in an agreement with Congress, over the objections of current DCI General Michael Hayden. Hayden said its publication would "consume time and attention revisiting ground that is already well plowed."  Tenet disagreed with the report's conclusions, citing his planning efforts vis-à-vis al-Qaeda, particularly from 1999.

Abuses of CIA authority, 1970s–1990s
Conditions worsened in the mid-1970s, around the time of Watergate. A dominant feature of political life during that period were the attempts of Congress to assert oversight of the U.S. Presidency and the executive branch of the U.S. government. Revelations about past CIA activities, such as assassinations and attempted assassinations of foreign leaders (most notably Fidel Castro and Rafael Trujillo) and illegal domestic spying on U.S. citizens, provided the opportunities to increase Congressional oversight of U.S. intelligence operations.

Hastening the CIA's fall from grace were the burglary of the Watergate headquarters of the Democratic Party by former CIA officers, and President Richard Nixon's subsequent attempt to use the CIA to impede the FBI's investigation of the burglary. In the famous "smoking gun" recording that led to President Nixon's resignation, Nixon ordered his chief of staff, H. R. Haldeman, to tell the CIA that further investigation of Watergate would "open the whole can of worms about the Bay of Pigs". In this way Nixon and Haldemann ensured that the CIA's No. 1 and No. 2 ranking officials, Richard Helms and Vernon Walters, communicated to FBI Director L. Patrick Gray that the FBI should not follow the money trail from the burglars to the Committee to Re-elect the President, as it would uncover CIA informants in Mexico. The FBI initially agreed to this due to a long-standing agreement between the FBI and CIA not to uncover each other's sources of information, though within a couple of weeks the FBI demanded this request in writing, and when no such formal request came, the FBI resumed its investigation into the money trail. Nonetheless, when the smoking gun tapes were made public, damage to the public's perception of CIA's top officials, and thus to the CIA as a whole, could not be avoided.

Repercussions from the Iran-Contra affair arms smuggling scandal included the creation of the Intelligence Authorization Act in 1991. It defined covert operations as secret missions in geopolitical areas where the U.S. is neither openly nor apparently engaged. This also required an authorizing chain of command, including an official, presidential finding report and the informing of the House and Senate Intelligence Committees, which, in emergencies, requires only "timely notification."

2004, DNI takes over CIA top-level functions
The Intelligence Reform and Terrorism Prevention Act of 2004 created the office of the Director of National Intelligence (DNI), who took over some of the government and intelligence community (IC)-wide functions that had previously been the CIA's. The DNI manages the United States Intelligence Community and in so doing it manages the intelligence cycle. Among the functions that moved to the DNI were the preparation of estimates reflecting the consolidated opinion of the 16 IC agencies, and preparation of briefings for the president. On July 30, 2008, President Bush issued Executive Order 13470 amending Executive Order 12333 to strengthen the role of the DNI.

The Director of Central Intelligence (DCI) used to oversee the Intelligence Community, serving as the president's principal intelligence advisor, additionally serving as head of the CIA. The DCI's title now is "Director of the Central Intelligence Agency" (D/CIA), serving as head of the CIA.

The CIA now reports to the Director of National Intelligence. Prior to the establishment of the DNI, the CIA reported to the President, with informational briefings to congressional committees. The National Security Advisor is a permanent member of the National Security Council, responsible for briefing the President with pertinent information collected by all U.S. intelligence agencies, including the National Security Agency, the Drug Enforcement Administration, etc. All 16 Intelligence Community agencies are under the authority of the Director of National Intelligence.

Iraq War

72 days after the 9/11 attacks President Bush told his Secretary of Defense to update the U.S. plan for an invasion of Iraq, but not to tell anyone.  Secretary Donald Rumsfeld asked Bush if he could bring DCI Tenet into the loop, to which Bush agreed.

Feelers the CIA had put out to Iraq in the form of 8 of their best officers in Kurdish territory in Northern Iraq hit a goldmine, unprecedented in the famously closed, almost fascist Hussein government.  By December 2002 the CIA had close to a dozen good networks in Iraq and advanced so far that they penetrated Iraq's SSO, and even tap the encrypted communications of the Deputy Prime Minister, even the bodyguard of Hussein's son became an agent.  As time passed, the CIA became more and more frantic about the possibility of their networks being compromised, "rolled up".  To the CIA, the Invasion had to occur before the end of February 2003 if their sources inside Hussein's government were to survive.  The rollup would happen as predicted, 37 CIA sources recognized by their Thuraya satellite telephones provided for them by the CIA.

The case Colin Powell presented before the United Nations (purportedly proving an Iraqi WMD program) was wishful thinking.  DDCI John E. McLaughlin was part of a long discussion in the CIA about equivocation.  McLaughlin, who would make, among others, the "slam dunk" presentation to the President, "felt that they had to dare to be wrong to be clearer in their judgements".  The Al Qaeda connection, for instance, was from a single source, extracted through torture, and was later denied.  Curveball was a known liar, and the sole source for the mobile chemical weapons factories.  A postmortem of the intelligence failures in the lead up to Iraq led by former DDCI Richard Kerr would conclude that the CIA had been a casualty of the cold war, wiped out in a way "analogous to the effect of the meteor strikes on the dinosaurs."

The opening days of the Invasion of Iraq would see successes and defeats for the CIA.  With its Iraq networks compromised, and its strategic and tactical information shallow, and often wrong, the intelligence side of the invasion itself would be a black eye for the Agency.  The CIA would see some success with its "Scorpion" paramilitary teams composed of CIA Special Activities Division agents, along with friendly Iraqi partisans.  CIA SAD officers would also help the US 10th Special Forces.  The occupation of Iraq would be a low point in the history of the CIA.  At the largest CIA station in the world agents would rotate through 1–3 month tours.  In Iraq almost 500 transient agents would be trapped inside the Green Zone while Iraq Station Chiefs would rotate with only a little less frequency.

Operation Neptune Spear

On May 1, 2011, President Barack Obama announced that Osama bin Laden was killed earlier that day by "a small team of Americans" operating in Abbottabad, Pakistan, during a CIA operation.  The raid was executed from a CIA forward base in Afghanistan by elements of the U.S. Navy's Naval Special Warfare Development Group and CIA paramilitary operatives.

It resulted in the acquisition of extensive intelligence on the future attack plans of al-Qaeda.

The operation was a result of years of intelligence work that included the CIA's capture and interrogation of Khalid Sheik Mohammad (KSM), which led to the identity of a courier of Bin Laden's, the tracking of the courier to the compound by Special Activities Division paramilitary operatives and the establishing of a CIA safe house to provide critical tactical intelligence for the operation.

Reorganization
On 6 March 2015, the office of the D/CIA issued an unclassified edition a statement by the Director, titled 'Our Agency's Blueprint for the Future', as a press release for public consumption. The press release announced sweeping plans for the reorganization and reform of the CIA, which the Director believes will bring the CIA more in line with the Agency doctrine called the 'Strategic Direction'. Among the principal changes disclosed include the establishment of a new directorate, the Directorate of Digital Innovation, which is responsible for designing and crafting the digital technology to be used by the Agency, to keep the CIA always ahead of its enemies. The Directorate of Digital Innovation will also train CIA staff in the use of this technology, to prepare the CIA for the future, and it will also use the technological revolution to deal with cyber-terrorism and other perceived threats. The new directorate will be the chief cyber-espionage arm of the Agency going forward.

Other changes which were announced include the formation of a Talent Development Center of Excellence, the enhancement and expansion of the CIA University and the creation of the office of the Chancellor to head the CIA University in order to consolidate and unify recruitment and training efforts. The office of the Executive Director will be empowered and expanded and the secretarial offices serving the Executive Director will be streamlined. The restructuring of the entire Agency is to be revamped according to a new model whereby governance is modelled after the structure and hierarchy of corporations, said to increase the efficiency of workflow and to greatly enable the Executive Director to manage day-to-day activity. As well, another stated intention was to establish 'Mission Centers', each one to deal with a specific geographic region of the world, which will bring the full collaboration and joint efforts of the five Directorates together under one roof. While the Directorate heads will still retain ultimate authority over their respective Directorate, the Missions Centers will be led by an Assistant Director who will work with the capabilities and talents of all five Directorates on mission-specific goals for the parts of the world which they are given responsibility for.

The unclassified version of the document ends with the announcement that the National Clandestine Service (NCS) will be reverting to its original Directorate name, the Directorate of Operations. The Directorate of Intelligence is also being renamed, it will now be the Directorate of Analysis.

References

Further reading
 
Andrew, Christopher. For the President's Eyes Only: Secret Intelligence and the American Presidency from Washington to Bush (1995) Excerpt
 Callanan, James. "Eisenhower, the CIA, And Covert Action." in  Chester J. Pach, ed., A Companion To Dwight D. Eisenhower (2017): 350-369.
 Dujmovic, Nicholas, "Drastic Actions Short of War: The Origins and Application of CIA's Covert Paramilitary Function in the Early Cold War," Journal of Military History, 76 (July 2012), 775–808
Gates, Robert. US Intelligence and the End of the Cold War (1999)
 Hilsman,  Roger. To Move a Nation: The Politics of Foreign Policy in the Administration of John F. Kennedy (1967) pp 63–88.
 Neu, Charles E. "Understanding the CIA." Reviews in American History (1991) 19#1: 128-135.  Online, historiography

 Prados, John. Presidents' Secret Wars: CIA and Pentagon Covert Operations from World War II Through the Persian Gulf War  (1996)
 Ranelagh, John.  CIA: A History (1992) very favorable review
 Richelson, Jeffrey T. The US intelligence community (Routledge, 2018).
 
 
 
 Schroeder, Richard E. The Foundation of the CIA: Harry Truman, the Missouri Gang, and the Origins of the Cold War (U of Missouri Press, 2017).
 
 Willmetts, Simon. "The CIA and the invention of tradition." Journal of Intelligence History 14.2 (2015): 112-128, Historiography

Central Intelligence Agency
1947 establishments in the United States
Government agencies established in 1947
History of espionage